I'm Not OK is the debut EP by the German rock band Tokio Hotel's lead singer, Bill Kaulitz, and was released through iTunes on May 20, 2016 under the moniker BILLY. It contains 5 songs. The official artwork was designed by German designer Andrew Brawl, who is also a good friend of Kaulitz. The EP leaked on the Internet in April, nearly a month before official release due to iTunes music releasing system issues.

Background
The songs were originally written by Kaulitz for Tokio Hotel’s upcoming album at the time, Kings of Suburbia, but were found personal and not fitting for Tokio Hotel’s sound. Kaulitz decided to release them as a solo artist. He describes the EP as the diary of his feelings after a heartbreak he experienced. Each song will feature something special. For  “Love Don’t Break Me,” it was a short film, a photo book and a photo exhibition.

Mini-tour
The EP was supported by a mini tour across 5 cities: Los Angeles, Mexico City, Berlin, Paris and Milan. Tickets for the events were very limited and sold out just in hours after being available. The events included meet and greet with Kaulitz, fan questions, art exhibition, book signing and private listening session of EP.

Singles
The first and lead single off the EP is “Love Don’t Break Me”, released 29 April 2016. The video was shot back in October, 2015 in Los Angeles by Shiro Gutzie and Davis Factor and premiered with the single release.

Track listing

Music videos

References

2016 EPs
Bill Kaulitz albums
Electropop EPs
Synth-pop EPs